The Curtiss XP-31 Swift (Wright Field Project Number XP-934) was a 1930s American experimental monoplane fighter built by Curtiss for the United States Army Air Corps.

The XP-31 featured the first enclosed cockpit on a U.S. pursuit aircraft and was also the last pursuit aircraft to have fixed landing gear and externally braced wings. Despite its innovations, the XP-31 did not offer any advantages compared to its rival the Boeing P-26 Peashooter and was not ordered into series production.

Design and development
Curtiss offered the XP-31 (given the Wright Field Project Number XP-934) in a 1932 competition with the P-26. It was a low-wing monoplane with fixed landing gear, first flown in July. It was the AAC's first single-seat closed-cockpit fighter, and the last with fixed gear and wing struts. Despite its small size, it was badly overweight, and carried 125 gallons (104 imp gal, 474 L) of fuel. Although Curtiss considered the design significant in that it introduced various new technologies, compared to its contemporaries the XP-31 was already outmoded, and, more importantly, testing showed that it fell below performance expectations.

Testing and evaluation

Powered by a 700 hp (520 kW) R-1750 Cyclone radial, its performance was dismal, despite retractable leading edge slots and large trailing-edge flaps, so a 600 hp (450 kW) Curtiss V-1570 Conqueror was substituted. In this form, the Curtiss XP-31 Swift (s/n 33-178) was delivered on 1 March 1933, having already lost to the P-26. The sole example was scrapped in 1935.

Operators

United States Army Air Corps

Specifications

References
Notes

Bibliography

 Bowers, Peter M. Curtiss Aircraft 1907-1947. London: Putnam & Company Ltd., 1979. .
 Donald, David, ed. Encyclopedia of World Aircraft. Etobicoke, Ontario, Canada: Prospero Books, 1997. .
 Dorr, Robert F. and David Donald. Fighters of the United States Air Force. London: Aerospace Publishing, 1990. .
 Green, William and Gordon Swanborough. The Complete Book of Fighters. New York: Smithmark, 1994. .
 Jones, Lloyd S. U.S. Fighters: Army-Air Force 1925 to 1980s. Fallbrook, California: Aero Publishers, 1975. .
 Pedigree of Champions: Boeing Since 1916, Third Edition. Seattle, Washington: The Boeing Company, 1969.

External links

Curtiss P-31
P-31 Swift
Single-engined tractor aircraft
Low-wing aircraft
Aircraft first flown in 1932